The Happy Go Lucky Show is an Australian television variety series which aired from 30 October 1957 to 4 November 1959 on Melbourne television station GTV-9. Originally hosted by Happy Hammond, by 1958 the series was hosted by Bob Horsfall. Horsfall sometimes had a female co-host, these varied during the run of the series and included Pat McCormack, Susan Gaye Anderson, Patricia Rumbold, and (during 1959) Joy Fountain. The series aired at 1:00PM on Wednesdays. During 1958, one of the segments included "community singing". Other segments included guests and competitions.

Early Australian television series often aired in just a single city, which was also the case with The Happy Go Lucky Show. It is unlikely (though not impossible) that any of the episodes were kinescoped.

References

External links

Nine Network original programming
1957 Australian television series debuts
1959 Australian television series endings
English-language television shows
Black-and-white Australian television shows
Australian non-fiction television series